Abd ol Mohammad (also Romanized as ‘Abd ol Moḩammad) is a village in Horr Rural District, Dinavar District, Sahneh County, Kermanshah Province, Iran. At the 2006 census, its population was 167, in 43 families.

References 

Populated places in Sahneh County